They Were Expendable is a 1945 American war film directed by John Ford, starring Robert Montgomery and John Wayne, and featuring Donna Reed. The film is based on the 1942 novel of the same name by William Lindsay White, relating the story of the exploits of Motor Torpedo Boat Squadron Three, a United States PT boat unit defending the Philippines against Japanese invasion during the Battle of the Philippines (1941–42) in World War II.

While a work of fiction, the book was based on actual events and people. The characters John Brickley (Montgomery) and Rusty Ryan (Wayne) are fictionalizations of PT-Boat Squadron Three Commander John D. Bulkeley, a Medal of Honor recipient, and his executive officer Robert Kelly, respectively. Both the film and the book, which was a best-seller and excerpted in Reader's Digest and Life, depict certain combat-related events that were believed to have occurred during the war, alongside those which did not;  nonetheless, the film is noted for its relatively accurate and detailed depiction of naval combat for the era in which it was made.

Plot 

In December 1941 Lt. John "Brick" Brickley (Robert Montgomery) commands a squadron of agile but small and unproven U.S. Navy PT boats based at Cavite in the Philippines. He puts on a demonstration of their maneuverability and seakeeping capabilities for the senior area commander, Admiral Blackwell (Charles Trowbridge), who remains unimpressed by their diminutive size and lightweight construction. Lt. J.G. "Rusty" Ryan (John Wayne), Brick's executive officer and friend, is hot on getting into combat. He becomes disgusted at the admiral's close-minded dismissal and is writing his request for transfer to destroyer duty when news of the Japanese attack on Pearl Harbor arrives by radio bulletin.

Japanese forces descend by on the Philippines and wreak havoc.  Bypassed by local brass, Brick's squadron is kept out of combat and marginalized to menial mail and messenger duty. Frustration, particularly with Rusty, grows and threatens to boil over.  Following a devastating attack on their base, the desperate admiral relents and orders them to attack a large Japanese cruiser shelling U.S troop emplacements ashore. After initially choosing Rusty to skipper the second boat on the sortie, Brick discovers that his exec has blood poisoning from a previous combat wound and orders him to sick bay, selecting another boat and crew to take his place. 

After accusing his CO of glory hogging, and resisting evacuation to a military hospital on Corregidor, Rusty arrives there still hissing and spitting, only to reluctantly admit to the severity of his life-threatening condition.  There he meets another patient, "Ohio" (Louis Jean Heydt), who chides him to cool off and get in line.  Once he does, Rusty begins a romance with strong-willed Army nurse Sandy Davyss (Donna Reed), so attractive, kind, and wholesomely appealing Ohio cracks, "Eleven-thousand men can't be wrong" about her. 

Brick's attack sinks the cruiser. Rusty returns and the squadron is unleashed, achieving increasing success, though at the cost both of boats and men. Still, it is only a matter of time before the Philippines fall. Sandy attends a dinner in her honor at the PT Base, reigniting the flame between her and Rusty.

The squadron is marooned on the Phillippine island of Corregidor in Manila Bay, just Southeast of the large Northern-most Philippine island of Luzon after the Japanese onslaught against the doomed American defenders at the Bataan.  Corregidor stands as the last American stronghold against the advancing Japanese invaders.  The PT Squadron are then assigned to evacuate the commanding general of the Pacific Theatre, Douglas MacArthur, his entourage, and Admiral Blackwell to the Southern-most Philippine island of Mindanao, where they will be flown South to Australia. Rusty manages to make a last phone call to Sandy, now on Bataan, to explain he has been ordered out, but before they can say goodbye the connection is cut off.  

The small PT flotilla successfully carries the commanders across spans of open ocean to their rendezvous. It then resumes its attacks against the Japanese, who gradually whittle the squadron down too small to function effectively. Crews without boats are sent to link up with the Army and fight as infantry. After Rusty's boat is damaged, the last two PTs pull into a small shipyard run by crusty "Dad" Knowland (Russell Simpson) for repairs.  As the boats leave in haste ahead of an imminent Japanese assault, Dad refuses to flee, bidding his poignant farewell with a rifle folded in his arms and a whisky jug tucked securely at his feet.  

In a final assault that destroys another threatening cruiser, Rusty's boat is sunk, after which Brick's is turned over to the US Army, once again reduced to messenger duty. Brick, Ryan and two ensigns are ordered by Navy command to be airlifted out on the last plane, assigned stateside to train PT crews, the small, inexpensive wood-hulled boats having proved their worth in combat.  While waiting for the plane, Rusty runs into Ohio.  Neither knows what happened to Sandy, trapped behind on Bataan. Each helps the other to hope she escaped to the hills rather than meet her likely dark fate.  When the ensigns finally arrive late, Rusty bolts for the aircraft's exit, but is brought to heel by Brickley, who reminds him his duty comes first.  Ohio is forced to give up his seat on the plane and is left behind to face certain death or capture.

The surviving enlisted men, led by Chief Mulcahey (Ward Bond), shoulder rifles and march off to continue the resistance with the remnants of the U.S. Army and Filipino guerrillas, as expendable in the fight as their PT boats had been before them.

Cast 

 Robert Montgomery as Lieutenant John Brickley (as Robert Montgomery Comdr. U.S.N.R.)
 John Wayne as Lieutenant (junior grade) "Rusty" Ryan 
 Donna Reed as 2nd Lieutenant Sandy Davyss
 Jack Holt as General Martin
 Ward Bond as BMC "Boats" Mulcahey 
 Marshall Thompson as Ensign "Snake" Gardner
 Paul Langton as Ensign "Andy" Andrews
 Leon Ames as Major James Morton
 Arthur Walsh as Seaman Jones
 Donald Curtis as Lieutenant (J.G.) "Shorty" Long/Radio Announcer
 Cameron Mitchell as Ensign George Cross
 Jeff York as Ensign Tony Aiken
 Murray Alper as TM1c "Slug" Mahan 
 Harry Tenbrook as SC2c "Squarehead" Larsen 
 Jack Pennick as "Doc"
 Alex Havier as ST3c "Benny" Lecoco 
 Charles Trowbridge as Admiral Blackwell
 Robert Barrat as The General
 Bruce Kellogg as Elder Tompkins MoMM2c
 Tim Murdock as Ensign Brant
 Louis Jean Heydt as "Ohio"
 Russell Simpson as "Dad" Knowland
 Vernon Steele as Army Doctor

Production 
Following the acquisition of the film rights to White's They Were Expendable, MGM asked Ford to direct a film based on the book; Ford repeatedly refused due to his conflicting service in the Navy Field Photographic Unit. While he was serving in the Photographic Unit, Ford met Lieutenant John D. Bulkeley during the preparation of the Normandy Invasion and later signed Bulkeley's D-Day executive officer Robert Montgomery.

According to Turner Classic Movies host Ben Mankiewicz, Ford, a notoriously tough taskmaster who had received a commission as a commander in the U.S. Navy Reserve in his late 40s during WWII, was especially hard on Wayne, who had been turned down by the armed forces. During production, Ford fell from scaffolding and broke his leg. He turned to Montgomery, who had actually commanded a PT boat, to temporarily take over for him as director. Montgomery did so well that within a few years he made the transition from actor to directing films.

The film, which received extensive support from the Navy Department, was shot in Key Biscayne, Florida and the Florida Keys. This region of sandy islands and palm trees around 25° North latitude sufficiently approximated the Philippines between approximately 10° and 15° North where the film's action took place in the South West Pacific Theater of World War II. Two actual U.S. Navy 80-foot Elco PT boats (hull numbers PT-139 and 141), and four 78-foot Higgins PT boats, (hull numbers PT-98, 100, 101, 102), were used throughout filming, given hull numbers in use in late 1941 and early 1942 for the film. Additional U.S. aircraft from nearby naval air stations in Miami, Fort Lauderdale and Key West were temporarily re-marked and used to simulate Japanese aircraft in the film.

Ford's onscreen directing credit reads, "Directed by John Ford, Captain U.S.N.R."; Frank Wead's onscreen credit reads: "Screenplay by Frank Wead Comdr. U.S.N., Ret"; Montgomery's onscreen credit reads: "Robert Montgomery Comdr. U.S.N.R."

Depiction of PT boats' effectiveness
The movie likely exaggerated the actual effectiveness of the PT boats in the war, and in at least one instance loosely referenced Commander Bulkeley's own exaggerated statements.   Lt. Brickley, the character most closely based on the real Commander John Bulkeley, declares at one point in the movie that PT Boats had "sunk two converted cruisers, an auxiliary aircraft carrier, a 10,000-ton tanker, a large freighter, a flock of barges and numerous sons of Nippon!" This statement is very similar to a claim made by the real Commander Bulkeley himself during the war that "Our little half squadron sank one Jap cruiser, one plane tender, and one loaded transport, badly damaged another cruiser, set a tanker on fire and shot down four planes".  According to William Doyle, the highly credible author of PT 109: An American Epic of War, Survival, and the Destiny of John F. Kennedy, "after the war, when Japanese Naval loss records were examined by U. S. Naval Intelligence experts, it was learned that these claims were inaccurate and exaggerated".  Contemporary historians of President John F. Kennedy, William Doyle, and Fredrik Logevall noted that one of the primary problems of the PT boats were the accuracy and relatively slow speed of their Mark 8 torpedoes.  Added to the problem of inaccuracy at reaching target, as many as 50% failed to explode on contact with enemy ships due to faulty calibration by the Navy in the early years of the war.

Awards and honors
Douglas Shearer was nominated for the Oscar for Best Sound Recording, while A. Arnold Gillespie, Donald Jahraus, R. A. MacDonald and Michael Steinore were nominated for Best Effects. It was also named in the "10 Best Films of 1945" list by The New York Times.

In his Movie and Video Guide film critic and historian Leonard Maltin awarded They Were Expendable a four-star rating, describing it as a "moving, exquisitely detailed production" that is "one of the finest (and most underrated) of all WW2 films."

See also 
 Battle of Corregidor
 Bataan Death March - The fate of many captured by the Japanese on Bataan
 Patrol torpedo boat PT-109
 Philippines campaign (1944–1945)
 Douglas MacArthur
 Invasion of Lingayen Gulf, Background

Notes

References

Further reading
 Blank, Joan Gill. Key Biscayne. Sarasota, FL: Pineapple Press, 1996. .

External links 
 At Close Quarters – PT Boats in the United States Navy by Captain Robert J. Bulkley, Jr., USNR (Retired)
 
 
 
 
 
 They Were Expendable: A Critique of John Ford's 1945 War Film 

1945 films
1945 war films
American black-and-white films
American war films
1940s English-language films
Films scored by Herbert Stothart
Films directed by John Ford
Films set in the Philippines
Metro-Goldwyn-Mayer films
Pacific War films
Films about the United States Navy in World War II
World War II films made in wartime
Films set in 1941